Brighton & Hove Albion Under-21s and Academy are the youth teams of Brighton & Hove Albion. The under-21 players play in the Premier League 2 Division 1, the highest tier of under-21 team football in England. They also compete in the Premier League International Cup.The academy teams culminate with the under-18's squad, who compete in the U18 Premier League Division South.

Under-21 squad

Out on loan

Under-18 squad

References

External links
 Brighton & Hove Albion Under-23s at brightonandhovealbion.com
 Brighton & Hove Albion Under-18s at brightonandhovealbion.com

Reserves
Football academies in England
Premier League International Cup